Paolo del Sera (161722 September 1672) was a Florentine artist and art connoisseur of Venetian art who is best known for his correspondence with Leopoldo de 'Medici. He is said to have trained under Domenico Passignano and in Venice under Tiberio Tinelli, and respected as a portrait painter.

See also
Annunciation (Veronese, Uffizi)

References 

1617 births
Painters from Florence
1672 deaths
Italian art dealers
Italian Renaissance painters
Painters from Venice